The Living Desert Zoo and Gardens, formerly the Living Desert Museum, is a non-profit zoo and desert botanical garden located in Palm Desert, Riverside County, California, United States. The Living Desert is home to over 500 animals representing over 150 species and welcomes over 500,000 visitors annually. Situated in the Sonoran Desert of the Coachella Valley and Santa Rosa Mountains foothills near Palm Springs, California, The Living Desert is set on 1,200 acres, with 80 developed as zoo and gardens. 

The Living Desert Zoo and Gardens has been a member of the Association of Zoos and Aquariums (AZA) since 1983, and is a member of the World Association of Zoos and Aquariums (WAZA). It has participated in species reintroduction programs including the peninsular bighorn sheep to the local mountains and returning Arabian oryx to Oman.

History

The gardens of the Low Desert – Colorado Desert were established in 1970 as a  wilderness preserve by several trustees of the Palm Springs Desert Museum. By 1974, the gardens housed a kit fox, tortoises, lizards, and two bighorn sheep. In 1974–75 the Mojave Garden was built, a replica of the High Desert – Mojave Desert. Additional facilities have gradually been constructed, including greenhouses, model trains, and designed landscape gardens. New animal introductions include rhim gazelles (1981); mountain lions, bobcats and badgers (1993); meerkats; cheetahs and warthogs (1995); striped hyenas (1998); giraffes and ostriches (2002). The 'Amphibians on the Edge' exhibit shows a variety of different species of frogs, toads, and salamanders (2007). The Endangered Species Carousel was constructed in fall 2009, and the Peninsular Pronghorn Exhibit was constructed in fall 2010. The exhibit, Monarch of the Desert, was constructed on the North America Trail and featured the majestic jaguar. In 2020, Australian Adventures opened as an immersive habitat featuring Bennett's Wallaby, Yellow-footed rock wallaby, kookaburra and more. The Living Desert opened the Rhino Savanna in Fall 2021. The Living Desert is one of six accredited (AZA) private zoos in the United States and operates as a non-profit.

Goals and Mission
The Living Desert Zoo and Gardens' mission is desert conservation through preservation, education, and appreciation. It is a zoo and botanic garden combination dedicated solely to the deserts of the world. The programs provide environmental education, native wildlife rehabilitation, plant propagation, and habitat restoration, and breeding of African, Australian, and North America species, including the area's iconic desert bighorn sheep.

Animal habitats 
The Living Desert Zoo and Gardens is divided into regions, each housing animals from three continents.

African Safari

Featured animals include:

 Abyssinian ground hornbill
 Arabian oryx
 African wild dog
 Cheetah
 Fennec fox
 Grévy's zebra
 Giraffe
 Grey crowned crane
 Helmeted guineafowl
 Kori bustard
 Ostrich
 Greater kudu
 Addra gazelle
 Cuvier's gazelle
 Slender-horned gazelle
 Addax
 Dromedary camel
 Amur leopard
 Striped hyena
 Bat-eared fox
 Serval
 Cape porcupine
 Common warthog
 Leopard tortoise
 Eastern black rhinoceros
 Springbok
 Waterbuck
 Klipspringer
 Cape vulture
 Great white pelican
 Pink-backed pelican
 Banded mongoose
 Common dwarf mongoose
 Naked mole-rat

Wilds of North America

Featured animals include:

 Bald eagle
 Desert bighorn sheep
 American badger
 Bobcat
 Caracal
 Island fox
 Kit fox
 Swift fox
 Ringtail
 Chacoan peccary
 Coyote
 Golden eagle
 Jaguar
 Mountain lion
 Mexican wolf
 Peninsular pronghorn
 White-nosed coati
 Common chuckwalla
 Desert tortoise

Australian Adventures

Australian Adventures is an immersive, walk-through habitat. Guests enter the habitat with the wallabies Featured animals include:

 Bennett's wallaby
 Emu
 Woylie
 Budgerigar 
 Short-beaked echidna
 Blue-tongued skink
 Central bearded dragon
 Centralian carpet python
 Frilled-neck lizard
 Olive python
 Laughing kookaburra
 Tawny frogmouth
 Yellow-footed rock-wallaby

Gardens and plant habitats
 The North American desert gardens include re-creations of a variety of desert plant community ecosystems:
 Mojave Desert – Joshua tree (Yucca brevifolia) habitat and Eastern Mojave Cima volcanic field habitat.
 Chihuahuan Desert – Rio Grande-Big Bend (New Mexico-Texas) and northern Mexican Plateau (Mexico) habitats.
 Sonoran Desert – Sonora, Mexico Madrean foothills habitat, Yuma Desert-southwest Arizona habitat and Vizcaíno Desert-Baja California Desert habitat gardens.
 Colorado Desert (Sonoran Desert sub-region) – desert mountains habitat of the indigenous  elevation landscape, the Cahuilla Ethnobotanic Garden of the locally indigenous Cahuilla people, and focus areas representing the Lower Colorado River Valley habitat and the Colorado-Sonoran Desert natural springs, ponds, and riparian habitats.
 Specialized focus gardens include:
 Agave Garden – More than 100 species of Agaves from throughout the Western Hemisphere.
 Aloe Garden – African aloes.
 East African Garden – large collection of native East African plants and trees, one of the larger collections of African plant species in North America.
 Euphorbia Garden – African Euphorbias.
 Aviary Oasis – Coachella Valley native desert palm oasis, with California fan palms (Washingtonia filifera) surrounding a walk in aviary.
 Barrel Cactus garden – Ferocactus species.
 Hummingbird Garden – plants that attract hummingbirds.
 Johnston Cactus Garden – various specimen cacti on display.
 Madagascar Garden – xeric plants endemic-unique to Madagascar.
 Mallow Garden – small collection of desert mallows.
 McDonald Butterfly and Wildflower Garden – nectar (adults) and 'grazing' (larvae) plants that attract migrating butterflies.
 Mexican Columnar Cactus Garden – tall columnar cacti sculptural specimens.
 Ocotillo Garden – nine of twelve known ocotillo species.
 Opuntia Garden – various prickly pear (Opuntia)  and cholla (Cylindropuntia) plants.
 Palm Garden – several hundred palm (Arecaceae) trees, of over fifty species from around the world.
 Primitive Garden – plants from the Jurassic period – cycads and ferns.
 Sage Garden – Salvia species of melliferous flower honey forage sage plants.
 Sheep Food Garden – plants that are food sources for desert bighorn sheep.
 Smoke Tree Garden – local native smoke trees (Psorothamnus spinosus) in a natural desert wash setting.
 Sonoran Arboretum – trees from the greater Sonoran Desert region in a designed garden setting.
 Wortz Demonstration Garden – Southwest landscape design display garden.
 Yucca Garden – Yucca species in a designed 'strap foliage garden.

Other features
The world's longest wooden G-scale model trestle lets trains travel between the upper and lower portions of the wash in which it was built – an almost  drop. The trains started in 1998 as part of the annual WildLights holiday program and ran only in the evenings. In 2000 the trains started running throughout the year and during the day and at present there are 18 separate train lines that can run simultaneously. The trains and track are managed by an all-volunteer team.

The Living Desert Zoo and Gardens features nature and hiking trails accessible only to members and visitors of the Park. 

Wildlife Wonders Show is seasonally offered and features free-flight birds, animal demonstrations, and encounters.

See also 

 Moorten Botanical Garden and Cactarium
 List of botanical gardens in the United States
 Index: Flora of the California desert regions

Notes

External links
 
 
 
 Organizational Profile – National Center for Charitable Statistics (Urban Institute)

Botanical gardens in California
Colorado Desert
Coachella Valley
Flora of the Sonoran Deserts
Gardens in Riverside County, California
Buildings and structures in Riverside County, California
Tourist attractions in Riverside County, California
Zoos in California
Zoos established in 1970
Palm Desert, California
Cactus gardens